Water treatment is any process that improves the quality of water to make it appropriate for a specific end-use. The end use may be drinking, industrial water supply, irrigation, river flow maintenance, water recreation or many other uses, including being safely returned to the environment.  Water treatment removes contaminants and undesirable components, or reduces their concentration so that the water becomes fit for its desired end-use. This treatment is crucial to human health and allows humans to benefit from both drinking and irrigation use.

Types

Drinking water treatment 

Water contamination is primarily caused by the discharge of untreated wastewater from enterprises. The effluent from various enterprises, which contains varying levels of contaminants, is dumped into rivers or other water resources. The wastewater may have a high proportion of organic and inorganic contaminants at the initial discharge. Industries generate wastewater as a result of fabrication processes, processes dealing with paper and pulp, textiles, chemicals, and from various streams such as cooling towers, boilers, and production lines.
Treatment for drinking water production involves the removal of contaminants and/or inactivation of any potentially harmful microbes from raw water to produce water that is pure enough for human consumption without any short term or long term risk of any adverse health effect.  In general terms, the greatest microbial risks are associated with ingestion of water that is contaminated with human or animal (including bird) faeces. Faeces can be a source of pathogenic bacteria, viruses, protozoa and helminths. The removal or destruction of microbial pathogens is essential, and commonly involves the use of reactive chemical agents such as suspended solids, to remove bacteria, algae, viruses, fungi, and minerals including iron and manganese. Research including Professor Linda Lawton's group at Robert Gordon University, Aberdeen is working to improve detection of cyanobacteria. These substances continue to cause great harm to several less developed countries who do not have access to effective water purification systems.

Measures taken to ensure water quality not only relate to the treatment of the water, but to its conveyance and distribution after treatment. It is therefore common practice to keep residual disinfectants in the treated water to kill bacteriological contamination during distribution and to keep the pipes clean.

Water supplied to domestic properties such as for tap water or other uses, may be further treated before use, often using an in-line treatment process. Such treatments can include water softening or ion exchange. Many proprietary systems also claim to remove residual disinfectants and heavy metal ions.

Wastewater treatment

Industrial water treatment

Processes 

Elimination of hazardous chemicals from the water, many treatment procedures have been applied. 

The processes involved in removing the contaminants include physical processes such as settling and filtration,  chemical processes such as disinfection and coagulation, and biological processes such as slow sand filtration.

A combination selected from the following processes (depending on the season and contaminants and chemicals present in the raw water) is used for municipal drinking water treatment worldwide.

Chemical 
Different chemical procedures for the conversion into final products or the removal of pollutants are used for the safe disposal of contaminants. 
 Pre-chlorination for algae control and arresting biological growth.
 Aeration along with pre-chlorination for removal of dissolved iron when present with relatively small amounts of manganese.
 Disinfection for killing bacteria, viruses and other pathogens, using chlorine, ozone and ultra-violet light.

Physical 
Physical techniques of water/waste water treatment rely on physical phenomena to complete the removal process, rather than biological or chemical changes.

Most common physical techniques are:

 Sedimentation is one of the most important main wastewater treatment procedures. Gravity settling is a method of separating particles from a fluid. The particle in suspension remains stable in quiescent conditions due to the decrease in water velocity throughout the water treatment process, following which the particles settle by gravitational force. For solids separation that is the removal of suspended solids trapped in the floc.
 Filtration is the technique of removing pollutants based on their particle size. Pollutant removal from waste water permits water to be reused for a variety of purposes. The types of filters used in the procedure differ depending on the contaminants present in the water. Particle filtration and Membrane filtration are the two main forms of waste water filtration.
 Dissolved air flotation (Degasification) is the process of removing dissolved gases from a solution . Henry's law states that the amount of dissolved gas in a liquid is proportionate to the partial pressure of the gas. Degasification is a low-cost method of removing carbon dioxide gas from waste water that raises the pH of the water by removing the gas.
 Deaerator is used to reduce oxygen and nitrogen in boiler feed water applications.

Physico-chemical 
Also referred to as "Conventional" Treatment
 Coagulation for flocculation. The addition of coagulants destabilizes colloidal suspensions by neutralizing their charges, resulting in the aggregation of smaller particles during the coagulation process.
 Coagulant aids, also known as polyelectrolytes – to improve coagulation and for more robust floc formation.
 Polyelectrolytes or also known in the field as polymers, usually consist of either a positive or negative charge. The nature of the polyelectrolyte used is purely based on the source water characteristics of the treatment plant.
 These will usually be used in conjunction with a primary coagulant such as ferric chloride, ferric sulfate, or alum.
Chemical precipitation is a common process used to reduce heavy metals concentrations in wastewater. The dissolved metal ions are transformed to an insoluble phase by a chemical interaction with a precipitant agent such as lime. In industrial applications stronger alkalis may be used to effect complete precipitation. In drinking water treatment, the common-ion effect  is often used to help reduce water hardness.

Flotation uses bubble attachment to separate solids or dispersed liquids from a liquid phase.

Membrane filtration 
Membrane filtration has gotten a lot of attention for inorganic effluent treatment since it can remove not only suspended solids and organic components, but also inorganic pollutants such heavy metals. For heavy metal removal, several forms of membrane filtration, such as ultrafiltration, nanofiltration, and reverse osmosis, can be used depending on the particle size that can be maintained.

Ion exchange 
Ion exchange is a reversible ion exchange process in which an insoluble substance (resin) takes ions from an electrolytic solution and releases additional ions of the same charge in a chemically comparable amount without changing the resin's structure.

Electrochemical treatment techniques 

 Electrodialysis (ED)
 Membrane electrolysis (ME)
 Electrochemical precipitation (EP)

Adsorption 
Adsorption is a mass transfer process in which a substance is transported from the liquid phase to the surface of a solid/liquid (adsorbent) and becomes physically and chemically bonded (adsorbate). Adsorption can be classified into two forms based on the type of attraction between the adsorbate and the adsorbent: physical and chemical adsorption, commonly known as physisorption and chemisorptions.

Activated carbon 
Activated carbons (ACs) or biological-activated carbon (BAC) are effective adsorbents for a wide variety of contaminants. The adsorptive removal of color, aroma, taste, and other harmful organics and inorganics from drinking water and wastewater is one of their industrial applications.

Both a high surface area and a large pore size can improve the efficiency of activated carbon. Activated carbon was utilized by a number of studies to remove heavy metals and other types of contaminants from wastewater. The cost of activated carbon is rising due to a shortage of commercial activated carbon (AC). Because of its high surface area, porosity, and flexibility, activated carbon has a lot of potential in wastewater treatment.

Biological 
This is the method by which dissolved and suspended organic chemical components are eliminated through biodegradation, in which an optimal amount of microorganism is given to re-enact the same natural self-purification process. Through two distinct biological process, such as biological oxidation and biosynthesis, microorganisms can degrade organic materials in wastewater. Microorganisms involved in wastewater treatment produce end products such as minerals, carbon dioxide, and ammonia during the biological oxidation process. The minerals (products) remained in the wastewater and were discharged with the effluent. Microorganisms use organic materials in wastewater to generate new microbial cells with dense biomass that is eliminated by sedimentation throughout the biosynthesis process.

Standards 

Many developed countries specify standards to be applied in their own country. In Europe, this includes the European Drinking Water Directive and in the United States the United States Environmental Protection Agency (EPA) establishes standards as required by the Safe Drinking Water Act. For countries without a legislative or administrative framework for such standards, the World Health Organization publishes guidelines on the standards that should be achieved. China adopted its own drinking water standard GB3838-2002 (Type II) enacted by Ministry of Environmental Protection in 2002.

Where drinking water quality standards do exist, most are expressed as guidelines or targets rather than requirements, and very few water standards have any legal basis or, are subject to enforcement. Two exceptions are the European Drinking Water Directive and the Safe Drinking Water Act in the United States, which require legal compliance with specific standards.

Developing countries

Appropriate technology options in water treatment include both community-scale and household-scale point-of-use (POU) or self-supply designs. Such designs may employ solar water disinfection methods, using solar irradiation to inactivate harmful waterborne microorganisms directly, mainly by the UV-A component of the solar spectrum, or indirectly through the presence of an oxide photocatalyst, typically supported TiO2 in its anatase or rutile phases. Despite progress in SODIS technology, military surplus water treatment units like the ERDLator are still frequently used in developing countries. Newer military style Reverse Osmosis Water Purification Units (ROWPU) are portable, self-contained water treatment plants are becoming more available for public use.

For waterborne disease reduction to last, water treatment programs that research and development groups start in developing countries must be sustainable by the citizens of those countries. This can ensure the efficiency of such programs after the departure of the research team, as monitoring is difficult because of the remoteness of many locations.

Energy Consumption: Water treatment plants can be significant consumers of energy. In California, more than 4% of the state's electricity consumption goes towards transporting moderate quality water over long distances, treating that water to a high standard. In areas with high quality water sources which flow by gravity to the point of consumption, costs will be much lower.
Much of the energy requirements are in pumping. Processes that avoid the need for pumping tend to have overall low energy demands. Those water treatment technologies that have very low energy requirements including trickling filters, slow sand filters, gravity aqueducts.

A 2021 study found that a large-scale water chlorination program in urban areas of Mexico massively reduced childhood diarrheal disease mortality rates.

See also
Control of water pollution
Clean Water Act
Peak water (water supply & demand)
Pulsed-power water treatment
Water purification
Water quality
Water softening
Water supply

References

External links

International Water Association Professional / research organization
NSF International – Independent non-profit standards organization
WHO.int, WHO Guidelines
Safe and Sustainable Water for Haiti web site hosted by Grand Valley State University

 
 
Treatment